This is the discography of American R&B/country/soul/pop vocal girl group The Pointer Sisters. The group made 16 trips to Billboards top 40 singles chart with a total of 27 singles registered altogether on the Billboard Hot 100, and 30 registered on Billboards Hot Soul/Black/R&B Singles Chart. Seven of those singles reached the top 10 singles chart on the Hot 100 and five of those hit the top five.

Albums

Studio albums

Live albums

Soundtrack albums
Highlights from Ain't Misbehavin': The New Cast Recording (1996, RCA Victor)

Compilation albums

Singles

 Notes
 "Fairytale" also peaked at #37 on the Hot Country Singles chart.

As featured artists

2018
"You Gotta Believe" (Audio in animated film by Nina Paley)

Music videos

Other appearances

References

External Links
 

Discographies of American artists
Rhythm and blues discographies
Pop music group discographies
Soul music discographies